A.J. Gass (born November 29, 1975) is a former Canadian football linebacker. He played his entire 10-year professional career with the Canadian Football League's Edmonton Eskimos.

Gass attended Servite High School and was the defensive MVP of the Sunset League, All CIF Southern Section and All State defensive back in 1992. Gass attended Fresno State University and was an all-conference first-team linebacker in 1996 and 1997, leading the conference in tackles in 1996 with 150.

Gass went undrafted in the National Football League and, on May 21, 1998, signed with the Eskimos as a free agent. Gass appeared in ten games in the 1998 CFL season, and soon established himself as a key member of the Eskimos' lineup. However, Gass battled a series of career-threatening injuries. In , a ruptured artery in his hand sidelined Gass for 11 weeks. In , 11 games into the season, Gass tore his ACL, MCL, and meniscus and required full reconstructive surgery. Once again, Gass battled back again to start the 2003 season with braces on both knees. He went on to win his first championship that season, the 91st Grey Cup with the Eskimos. In , Gass was a key cog in the Eskimos' victory in the 93rd Grey Cup.

Gass faced a suspension in  after he ripped the helmet off Calgary Stampeders lineman John Comiskey during a scuffle, and threw it to the ground. Gass claimed the situation arose after Jeff Pilon had groped his groin. After appealing to an independent arbitrator, Gass avoided his suspension. Later, during team practice, Gass' teammate Sean Fleming made a prank on him by putting a note and a protective jock strap on Gass' stall. The note read, "Sorry for being so frisky. Please accept this gift (the jock strap) as a reminder of my admiration...best of luck with your appeal. Signed: Jeff Pilon, No. 64 (a.k.a. 'Cuddles')". Taped to a rung in the locker stall was a jock strap labelled 'The Pilon Protector.'

In 131 career games, Gass amassed 440 defensive tackles, 92 special teams tackles, 13 pass knockdowns, 12 quarterback sacks, eight forced fumbles, 22 tackles for losses, 10 fumble returns and three interceptions. He became known for his hard-nosed play and punishing hits on defence and special teams, emerging as a leader and fan favorite at Commonwealth Stadium (referred to as the "heart and soul" of the Green and Gold defence).

On January 31, 2008, Gass announced his retirement as a player and was hired as a defensive assistant on the Edmonton coaching staff. "On the field, A.J. Gass played with heart, toughness and intelligence and I believe he'll carry those qualities with him to become a very successful coach," said Head Coach Danny Maciocia.

In the summer of 2010 Gass accepted a job and assistant coaching position at Servite High School in Southern California, where he lives with his wife Stacey and their two young children. In 2013, he was named Head Coach of Varsity Football for the Servite Friars in the highly regarded Trinity League of the PAC 5.

References 

1975 births
Living people
Canadian football linebackers
Edmonton Elks players
Fresno State Bulldogs football players
People from Bellflower, California
People from Corona, California
Servite High School alumni